Maranzhe is a village in Vhembe District Municipality in the Limpopo province of South Africa.

There are two schools at Maranzhe. Maranzhe Primary School (murangoni primary) and Luphai Secondary School.

References

Populated places in the Thulamela Local Municipality